Dillwynia tenuifolia is a species of flowering plant in the family Fabaceae and is endemic to eastern New South Wales. It is an erect shrub with linear leaves, and orange-yellow and red flowers.

Description

Taxonomy and naming
Dillwynia tenuifolia was first formally described in 1825 by Augustin Pyramus de Candolle in his Prodromus Systematis Naturalis Regni Vegetabilis. The specific epithet (tenuifolia) means "thin-leaved".

Distribution and habitat
This dillwynia grows in forest between the Cumberland Plain, Blue Mountains and Howes Valley on the coast and tablelands of New South Wales.

Conservation status
Dillwynia tenuifolia is listed as "vulnerable: under the New South Wales Government Biodiversity Conservation Act 2016, and a population in Kemps Creek is listed as an "endangered population" under the same Act. The main threats to the species and to the threatened population include habitat fragmentation, inappropriate fire regimes, weed invasion and recreational vehicle use.

References

tenuifolia
Fabales of Australia
Flora of New South Wales
Taxa named by Augustin Pyramus de Candolle
Plants described in 1825